HDMS Peder Skram (F352) was a  in the Royal Danish Navy which was in use until 1990. It is now docked at Holmen in Copenhagen where it serves as a privately operated museum ship along with the ships of the Royal Danish Naval Museum. The ship is named after Peder Skram, a 16th-century Danish admiral.

Construction and career
She was laid down on 25 September 1964 and launched on 20 May 1965 by Helsingør Skinsværft, Elsinore. Commissioned on 25 May 1966.

Peder Skram was an innovative design using a hybrid propulsion system, a combined gas turbine and diesel approach (CODOG). Peder Skram underwent significant refit in 1970 and a midlife update 1977–78 

On 11 June 1980, along with a minelayer Falster, by aggressive manoeuvring, drove off Polish command landing ship ORP Grunwald, reconnoitering Dannish coast near Hesselø island.

1982 Harpoon missile incident 

In 1982 Peder Skram was involved in the accidental launch of a Harpoon missile, which inflicted no bodily harm.

Peder Skram was decommissioned in 1990, internal installations were auctioned off as scrap two years later. In the mid-1990s it was decided to restore her as a museum ship.

Peder Skram is today operated as a museum ship on a volunteer basis. It is open to visitors every day from 11am to 5pm in the school summer and autumn vacations and in all weekends in June and August.

Gallery

See also
 
 List of museums in and around Copenhagen

References

External links

 Fregatten Peder Skram Museum Ship 
 Danish Naval History

Ships of the National Museum of Denmark
Museum ships in Copenhagen
Peder Skram-class frigates
Ships built in Helsingør
1965 ships
Frigates of the Cold War